The David Shields House (also known as Newington) at the corner of Shields Lane and Beaver Road in Edgeworth, Pennsylvania, was built in 1823.  This Federal style house was added to the National Register of Historic Places on October 29, 1975, and the List of Pittsburgh History and Landmarks Foundation Historic Landmarks in 1976.

References

Houses on the National Register of Historic Places in Pennsylvania
Houses in Allegheny County, Pennsylvania
Houses completed in 1823
Federal architecture in Pennsylvania
Pittsburgh History & Landmarks Foundation Historic Landmarks
National Register of Historic Places in Allegheny County, Pennsylvania
1823 establishments in Pennsylvania